The 2014–15 Valencia CF season was the club's 95th season in its history and its 80th in La Liga. This was the first season since 1997–98 that Valencia would not compete in any European competition due to having its lowest finish in six years the previous season. The team competed in La Liga and the Copa del Rey. In La Liga, they finished fourth, qualifying for the play-off round of the 2015–16 UEFA Champions League. In the Copa del Rey, Valencia lost to Espanyol in the round of 16. Dani Parejo was the club's top scorer in the league, with 12 goals, while Paco Alcácer was the club's top scorer overall, with 14 goals.

Squad

Out on loan

Transfers

In

Total expenditure: €14,600,000

Out

Total revenue: €25,100,000

Net income:  €25,100,000

Competitions

Overall

La Liga

Valencia didn't secure 4th position until the last match.

League table

Results summary

Results by round

Matches

Copa del Rey

Round of 32

Round of 16

Statistics

Appearances and goals
Last updated on 23 May 2015

|-
! colspan=14 style=background:#dcdcdc; text-align:center|Goalkeepers

|-
! colspan=14 style=background:#dcdcdc; text-align:center|Defenders

|-
! colspan=14 style=background:#dcdcdc; text-align:center|Midfielders

|-
! colspan=14 style=background:#dcdcdc; text-align:center|Forwards

|-
! colspan=14 style=background:#dcdcdc; text-align:center| Players who have made an appearance or had a squad number this season but have been loaned out or transferred
|-

|-
|}

Goalscorers
This includes all competitive matches.  The list is sorted by shirt number when total goals are equal.

Last updated on 21 March 2015

References

Valencia CF seasons
Valencia CF